Arniquet is a commune in the Port-Salut Arrondissement, in the Sud department of Haiti. In 2015, the commune had 29,180 inhabitants.

Settlements

References

Populated places in Sud (department)
Communes of Haiti